Gorbat Radio Television is a Pashto language private television station based in Kabul, Afghanistan.

See also
 List of television channels in Afghanistan

References 

Television channels and stations established in 2011
Television stations in Afghanistan
Pashto mass media
Pashto-language television stations
Mass media in Kabul
2011 establishments in Afghanistan